Aromatic-ring-hydroxylating dioxygenases (ARHD) incorporate two atoms of dioxygen (O2) into their substrates in the dihydroxylation reaction. The product is (substituted) cis-1,2-dihydroxycyclohexadiene, which is subsequently converted to (substituted) benzene glycol by a cis-diol dehydrogenase.

A large family of multicomponent mononuclear (non-heme) iron oxygenases has been identified. Components of bacterial aromatic-ring dioxygenases constitute two different functional classes: hydroxylase components and electron transfer components. Hydroxylase components are either (αβ)n or (α)n oligomers. Two prosthetic groups, a Rieske-type [Fe2S2] center and a mononuclear iron, are associated with the α-subunit in the (αβ)n-type enzymes. Electron transfer components are composed of flavoprotein (NADH:ferredoxin oxidoreductase) and Rieske-type [Fe2S2] ferredoxin. In benzoate and toluate 1,2-dioxygenase systems, a single protein containing reductase and Rieske-type ferredoxin domains transfers the electrons from NADH to the hydroxylase component. In the phthalate 4,5-dioxygenase system, phthalate dioxygenase reductase (PDR) has the same function. PDR is a single protein comprising FMN-binding reductase and plant-type ferredoxin domains. Thus, the electron transfer in ARHD systems can be summarised as:

Biochemical classification 
 benzene 1,2-dioxygenase
 benzene + NADH + H+ + O2 = cis-cyclohexa-3,5-diene-1,2-diol + NAD+

 phthalate 4,5-dioxygenase
 phthalate + NADH + H+ + O2 = cis-4,5-dihydroxycyclohexa-1(6),2-diene-1,2-dicarboxylate + NAD+

 4-sulfobenzoate 3,4-dioxygenase
 4-sulfobenzoate + NADH + H+ + O2 = 3,4-dihydroxybenzoate + sulfite + NAD+

 4-chlorophenylacetate 3,4-dioxygenase
 4-chlorophenylacetate + NADH + H+ + O2 = 3,4-dihydroxyphenylacetate + chloride + NAD+

 benzoate 1,2-dioxygenase
 benzoate + NADH + H+ + O2 = 1,2-dihydroxycyclohexa-3,5-diene-1-carboxylate + NAD+

 toluene dioxygenase
 toluene + NADH + H+ + O2 = (1S,2R)-3-methylcyclohexa-3,5-diene-1,2-diol + NAD+

 naphthalene 1,2-dioxygenase
 naphthalene + NADH + H+ + O2 = (1R,2S)-1,2-dihydronaphthalene-1,2-diol + NAD+

 terephthalate 1,2-dioxygenase
 terephthalate + NADH + H+ + O2 = (1R,6S)-dihydroxycyclohexa-2,4-diene-1,4-dicarboxylate + NAD+

 biphenyl 2,3-dioxygenase
 biphenyl + NADH + H+ + O2 = (1S,2R)-3-phenylcyclohexa-3,5-diene-1,2-diol + NAD+

Structure 

The crystal structure of the hydroxylase component of naphthalene 1,2-dioxygenase from Pseudomonas has been determined. The protein is an (αβ)3 hexamer. The β-subunit belongs to the
α+β class. It has no prosthetic groups and its role in catalysis is unknown. The α-subunit can be divided into two domains: a Rieske domain that contains the [Fe2S2] center and the catalytic domain that contains the active site mononuclear iron. The Rieske domain (residues 38-158) consists of four β-sheets. The overall fold is very similar to that of the soluble fragment of the Rieske protein from bovine heart mitochondrial cytochrome bc1 complex. In the [Fe2S2] center, Fe1 is coordinated by two cysteine residues (Cys-81 and Cys-101) while Fe2 is coordinated by Nδ atoms of two histidine residues (His-83 and His-104). The catalytic domain belongs to the α+β class and is dominated by a nine-stranded antiparallel β-sheet. The iron of the active site is located at the bottom of a narrow channel, approximately 15 Å from the protein surface. The mononuclear iron is coordinated by His-208, His-213, Asp-362 (bidentate) and a water molecule. The geometry can be described as a distorted octahedral with one ligand missing. The structure of the hexamer suggests cooperativity between adjacent α-subunits, where electrons from the [Fe2S2] center in one α-subunit (A) are transferred to the mononuclear iron in the adjacent α-subunit (B) through AspB-205, which is hydrogen-bonded to HisA-104 of the Rieske center and HisB-208 of the active site.

References

External links 
  - structure of naphthalene 1,2-dioxygenase from Pseudomonas putida
  - structure of biphenyl 2,3-dioxygenase from Rhodococcus sp. strain RHA1
  - InterPro entry for Bacterial ring hydroxylating dioxygenase, alpha subunit

Metalloproteins